YB or Yb may refer to:

Arts and entertainment
 YB (band), a South Korean rock band (short for Yoon Do Hyun Band)
 YoungBoy Never Broke Again (born 1999), American rapper
 Young Buck (born 1981), rapper

Businesses and organizations
 Youngstown Belt Railroad,  a part of the Ohio Central Railroad System
 Ypatingasis būrys, a Nazi killing squad primarily composed of Lithuanian volunteers
 BSC Young Boys, a Swiss football club

Computing
 Yottabit (Yb), a unit of information used, for example, to quantify computer memory or storage capacity
 Yottabyte (YB), a unit of information used, for example, to quantify computer memory or storage capacity

Other uses
 Yb, Russia
 Yang Berhormat, Malay for The Honorable, styled before Members of Parliament
 Ytterbium, symbol Yb, a chemical element